"Marché noir" is a song by French rapper SCH. It was released on 4 February 2021, as a single off his fifth studio album Jvlivs II and peaked atop the French Singles Chart.

Charts

Weekly charts

Year-end charts

References

2021 songs
2021 singles
French-language songs
Number-one singles in France
SCH (rapper) songs